Dennis Wayne Shedd (born January 28, 1953) is a former United States circuit judge of the United States Court of Appeals for the Fourth Circuit.

Background 
Shedd attended Orangeburg Preparatory Schools in Orangeburg, South Carolina. He received his Bachelor of Arts degree from Wofford College, his Juris Doctor from the University of South Carolina School of Law and a Master of Laws from the Georgetown University Law Center. He went on to become chief counsel and staff director for the Senate Committee on the Judiciary while in the employ of Senator Strom Thurmond.  He moved to South Carolina to practice law in 1988. During that time, he served as an adjunct professor of law at the University of South Carolina School of Law.

Federal judicial service

Service on district court
President George H. W. Bush nominated Shedd on October 17, 1990, to the United States District Court for the District of South Carolina. Shedd was confirmed on October 27, 1990. He  received his commission on October 30, 1990. His service as a district court judge was terminated on December 10, 2002, when he was elevated to the 4th Circuit Court.

Service on court of appeals
Shedd was nominated by President George W. Bush on September 4, 2001, and was confirmed by the United States Senate on November 19, 2002, by a 55–44 vote. He received his judicial commission on November 26, 2002. Shedd assumed senior status on January 30, 2018. He retired from the court on May 2, 2022.

Notable decisions
In 2007, Judge Shedd wrote for a fractured panel which found that the procedural default doctrine prevented the court from hearing the constitutional claims of a death row inmate.  On May 25, 2017, Judge Shedd wrote a dissent when the en banc circuit upheld a lower court's injunction against the President's travel ban by a vote of 10–3 in Int'l Refugee Assistance Project v. Trump.

References

Sources 
 

1953 births
Living people
20th-century American judges
21st-century American judges
Georgetown University Law Center alumni
Judges of the United States Court of Appeals for the Fourth Circuit
Judges of the United States District Court for the District of South Carolina
People from Orangeburg County, South Carolina
United States court of appeals judges appointed by George W. Bush
United States district court judges appointed by George H. W. Bush
University of South Carolina alumni
Wofford College alumni
University of South Carolina faculty